Schwülper is a municipality in the district of Gifhorn, in Lower Saxony, Germany. It is a member municipality of the Samtgemeinde Papenteich. The Municipality Schwülper includes the villages of Groß Schwülper, Hülperode, Klein Schwülper, Lagesbüttel, Rothemühle, and Walle

Municipal Council
The council of the Municipality Schwülper consists of 20 councilmen and woman:
 Christian Democratic Union 8 mandates
 Social Democratic Party 12 mandates

(Status: community election 10. September 2006 with a voter participation of 57,52%)

References

Gifhorn (district)